The 9th Northwest Territories Legislative Assembly was the 16th assembly of the territorial government from 1979 to 1983. The Commissioner turned over Executive Council privileges allowing elected members to form the cabinet and become leader of government in 1980 for the first time since 1905.

By-elections
At least 2 by-elections occurred in this Assembly.

References

External links
Northwest Territories Legislative Assembly homepage

009